Lancaster Girls' Grammar School (LGGS) is a selective state grammar school with academy status for girls on Regent Street in Lancaster, England. It was established in 1907.

About LGGS
LGGS gained Technology College status in 1995, and Language College status in 2007.

Centenary
The school passed its centenary year in 2007 bringing a few changes along with it. The school logo was updated and the uniform changed along with a new hall added to the main part of the school building.

House system
Lancaster Girls' Grammar school has a House system as girls are sorted into these house in first year, and remain affiliated with them for the rest of their school career. The Houses are named after the twin towns of Lancaster:

 Aalborg represented by the colour blue
 Perpignan  represented by the colour green
 Rendsburg represented by the colour red
 Lublin represented by the colour yellow
There are inter-house competitions throughout the year, including the Performing Arts Festival, Sports Day and the Music Festival.

History
The school was founded in 1907 as the Storey Institute. It was made in an effort to boost girls' education and was a fee-paying school until after World War Two. The school closed for a short period during the war and some students would sleep in the building although it was not considered a boarding school.

Notable former pupils

 Prof Noreen Murray FRS CBE, molecular geneticist

See also
 Lancaster Royal Grammar School

References

External links
 Photographs

Girls' schools in Lancashire
Educational institutions established in 1907
Schools in Lancaster, Lancashire
Grammar schools in Lancashire
1907 establishments in England
Academies in Lancashire